Gifford is part of the Ramboll Group, providing engineering consultancy, design, planning, project management and consulting services for buildings, infrastructure and the environment.

History
The firm was founded by Dr. Edwin Gifford, a pioneer of prestressed structures, in Southampton in 1951 under the name E.W.H. Gifford & Partners. It won the Queen's Award for Enterprise in 2002.

In March 2011, Gifford was bought by the consulting engineering company Ramboll.

Operations
The firm has activities focused on: Centres of excellence
Buildings
Civil Engineering
Environment Development Planning

It has offices in:

 Birmingham
 Cardiff
 Chester
 Leeds
 London
 Manchester
 Oxford
 Southampton
 Australia
 York
Abu Dhabi
Episkopi (Cyprus)
Dubai
Gibraltar
New Delhi

Notable projects

Gateshead Millennium Bridge, Gateshead, UK, for which it won the IStructE Supreme Award for engineering excellence and the RIBA Stirling Prize
Brading Roman Villa, Isle of Wight, UK
Forthside Bridge, Stirling, UK
M25 motorway widening, London, UK
Juan Pablo II Bridge, Chile
Hungerford Bridge Footbridges, London, UK
Twin Sails bridge, Poole, UK

References

External links
Official site

Business services companies of England
Companies based in Southampton
British companies established in 1951
Construction and civil engineering companies of England
IStructE Supreme Award laureates
Stirling Prize laureates
Engineering consulting firms of the United Kingdom
International engineering consulting firms
1951 establishments in England
Consulting firms established in 1951
Construction and civil engineering companies established in 1951